Renée Josiena Anna Slegers (born 5 February 1989) is a Dutch football coach and former international midfielder. As a player she represented Willem II, as well as Swedish Damallsvenskan clubs Djurgårdens IF and Linköpings FC. She won 55 caps for the Netherlands women's national football team and appeared at UEFA Women's Euro 2013. In November 2018 Slegers was appointed head coach of IF Limhamn Bunkeflo.

Club career
In 2011 Slegers left Willem II for Swedish club Djurgårdens IF. When Djurgårdens were relegated in 2012, she moved to Linköpings FC for the following season.

A serious knee injury sustained in November 2016 eventually brought about the end of Slegers' playing career and she was forced to announce her retirement in February 2018. She coached IF Limhamn Bunkeflo's under-19 team in the 2018 season and was promoted to the head coach role in November 2018.

International career
On 5 March 2009 Slegers debuted for the senior Netherlands women's national football team, against Russia in the Cyprus Cup. She was not selected in the squad as the Netherlands reached the semi-final of UEFA Women's Euro 2009.

In June 2013 national team coach Roger Reijners selected Slegers in the Netherlands squad for UEFA Women's Euro 2013 in Sweden. In March 2016, national team coach Arjan van der Laan selected Slegers for the Netherlands squad for the 2016 UEFA Women's Olympic Qualifying Tournament, in which she appeared for the Netherlands in the games against Norway and Sweden.

Slegers was disappointed when a knee injury ruled her out of UEFA Women's Euro 2017, which the Netherlands hosted and subsequently won. She had previously missed a year and a half of football due to a pelvic injury.

In March 2021 she was appointed Head coach for Sweden's U23 National team.

International goals
Scores and results list the Netherlands goal tally first.

Honours
Linköpings FC
 Damallsvenskan (1): 2016
 Svenska Cupen (2): 2013–14, 2014–15

References

External links
 
 
 Profile  at Onsoranje.nl
 Profile  at vrouwenvoetbalnederland.nl
 

1989 births
Living people
People from Someren
Dutch women's footballers
Netherlands women's international footballers
Eredivisie (women) players
Damallsvenskan players
Arsenal W.F.C. players
Willem II (women) players
Djurgårdens IF Fotboll (women) players
Linköpings FC players
Footballers from North Brabant
Dutch expatriate sportspeople in England
Dutch expatriate sportspeople in Sweden
Expatriate women's footballers in England
Expatriate women's footballers in Sweden
Women's association football midfielders
Dutch football managers
Dutch expatriate women's footballers